Philip Gregory Morris (born 1950) was an Archdeacon of Margam.

Morris was educated at the University of Leeds and ordained after studying at the College of the Resurrection, Mirfield.  After curacies in Aberdare and Neath he was a team vicar in Llantwit Major from 1988 until 2001 when he became a residential canon of Llandaff Cathedral.

References

1950 births
Living people
Alumni of the University of Leeds
Place of birth missing (living people)
Alumni of the College of the Resurrection
Archdeacons of Margam